Henry Green (1838 – 7 June 1900) was an English shipowner and Liberal politician.

Life
Green was born at Blackwall, London, the son of  Henry Green of Blackwall and Walthamstow.  He was educated at Cheam School and at Bonn University. He became a senior partner in the London shipowning firm of R & H Green, and a Director of the East and West India Dock Company. He was president of the Chamber of Shipping and in 1884 was appointed to a Royal Commission to enquire into the loss of life and property at sea. Green was also J.P. for Middlesex.

In the 1885 general election, Green was elected Member of Parliament for Poplar but he stood down in the 1886 general election.

Green married Frances Gisborne Lewin who was born in India. He lived at The Cherry Orchard, Old Charlton, Kent until his death on 7 June 1900 at the age of 61.

References

External links 

1838 births
1900 deaths
Liberal Party (UK) MPs for English constituencies
People educated at Cheam School
UK MPs 1885–1886
British businesspeople in shipping
University of Bonn alumni
19th-century British businesspeople